Castel Colonna was a comune (municipality) in the Province of Ancona in the Italian region Marche, located about  west of Ancona. It was called Tomba di Senigallia until 1921.

The municipality of Castel Colonna was disbanded 1 January 2014 and united to Ripe and Monterado in the new municipality of Trecastelli.

Town hall of the new administration was set in former Ripe's offices in Piazza Castello.

References

Cities and towns in the Marche
Trecastelli